was a leading Japanese actor. His film credits span three decades, from 1960 to 1990. One of his prominent appearances was in the lead role in Pastoral: To Die in the Country. Suga also appeared in The Gate of Youth, Sword of the Beast, and Theater of Life. He also portrays Souichiro Akizuki- the father of Nobuhiko, Kyoko and also the foster father of the protagonist Kotaro Minami in the tokusatsu series Kamen Rider Black.

A frequent television guest star, Suga acted in jidaigeki and contemporary shows. Twenty appearances on Abarenbō Shōgun, thirteen on Zenigata Heiji, eleven on Momotarō-zamurai, nine on Ōoka Echizen, seven on Edo o Kiru, and numerous guest roles on various programs in the Mito Komon and Hissatsu　series top his list of roles.

Death
On the night of March 16, 1994, on his way home in Aso ward, Kawasaki city, Kanagawa Prefecture, he was hospitalized for a blow to the head in contact with a motorcycle at a pedestrian crossing in front of his home, and 6 days later, on March 22, 1994, due to a brain contusion, Midori ward, Yokohama city he died at Yokohama New Urban Neurosurgery Hospital. on March 23, after the burial by family relatives was held, it became known in newspapers on March 24, and on March 25, the news was reported in each newspaper. on April 10, a funeral and farewell ceremony was held at the Yamaguchidai kaikan in Kawasaki city with Masao Sato, director of the Toei kyoto Studio, as the funeral chairperson. He died at the age of 59.

Filmography
FilmKnightly Advice (1962)Jûsan-nin no shikaku (1963) - NaritsuguAnkokugai Main Street (1964) - Katsuo NakataSword of the Beast (1965) - DaizaburoGohiki no shinshi (1966)Eleven Samurai (1967) - Lord NariatsuMushukunin mikogami no jôkichi: Kawakaze ni kako wa nagareta (1972)Mushukunin Mikogami no Jôkichi: Kiba wa hikisaita (1972)Onsen suppon geisha (1972) - Kurajirô HattoriSukeban: Tamatsuki asobi (1974) - KoikePastoral: To Die in the Country (1974) - MeÔoku ukiyo-buro (1977)Piranha-gundan: Daboshatsu no ten (1977) - Keiji SasamotoTarao Bannai: Kimen mura no sangeki (1978) - Kazuomi EbataThe Yagyu Conspiracy (1978) - Matsudaira TadanaoSeishun no mon (1981) - IchimuraTsumiki kuzushi (1983) - TeacherJinsei gekijo (1983)Renzoku satsujinki: Reiketsu (1984) - Takafumi TatsutaHakujitsumu 2 (1987) - DoctorShinran: Path to Purity (1987) - ZennenHanazono no meikyu (1998)Shaso (1989) - Hiroto, FukamachiGokudo no onna-tachi: Saigo no tatakai (1990) - Lawyer SakuraiKyokutô kuroshakai (1993)

TelevisionShinsho Taikōki (1973) - Ashikaga YoshiakiShadow Warriors (1980)Ōoku (1983)Kawaite sōrō (1984)Kamen Rider Black (1987, episode 1) - Souichiro AkizukiMito Komon''（1989,episode 18） - Ichijyo Sanyi

References

Japanese male film actors
1934 births
1994 deaths
20th-century Japanese male actors
People from Yuzawa, Akita
Actors from Akita Prefecture